San Felice is a church in Venice, northern Italy, located in the sestiere (district) of Cannaregio. It faces the eponymous campo (square), across the Strada Nova.

It was founded in the 10th century, although the first document mentioning it dates to 1117. It was reconsecrated in 1267  by the patriarch of Caorle and Jesolo after it had been deeply renewed. Starting from 1531, it was completely rebuilt in the style of Mauro Codussi.

The church has a square plan with two façades, the main one featuring pilasters with Corinthian capitals. The interior is on the Greek cross plan, with four pillars at the crossing supporting the arcades of the dome.

Artworks include a St. Demetrius attributed to the early Tintoretto (c. 1547) and a crucifix attributed to Andrea Brustolon. An inscription in the interior recalls the baptism of Carlo Rezzonico, future Pope Clement XIII, occurred here on 29 March 1693.

Sources

External links

 Churches of Venice

Roman Catholic churches in Venice
Renaissance architecture in Venice
16th-century Roman Catholic church buildings in Italy
1117 establishments in Europe
12th-century establishments in the Republic of Venice